Louis Du Bois (21 October 1626 – 1696) was a Huguenot colonist in New Netherland who, with two of his sons and nine other refugees, founded the town of New Paltz, New York. These Protestant refugees fled Catholic persecution in France, emigrating to the Rhenish Palatinate (in present-day Germany) and then to New Netherland, where they settled in Wiltwyck (present day Kingston, New York) and Nieuw Dorp (present-day Hurley, New York, settlements midway between New Amsterdam (present day New York City) and Beverwyck (today known as Albany, New York) before ultimately founding New Paltz.

Early life
Louis was the son of Chrétien du Bois and Françoise le Poivre of Wicres in Artois, and later Herlies in Romance Flanders, then part of Spanish Netherlands, today included in the Hauts-de-France region, France.

The third part of Horton, "The Memory of the Just is Blessed", begins with an extract from a document in the Archives du Nord, and commentary:

The article seemingly demonstrates that the christening recorded 21 Oct 1626 at Wicres refers to Toussaint du Bois, not his brother Louis.  Louis du Bois and his (apparent twin) brother Antoine were christened at Wicres 17 Jun 1622.  Louis and Antoine appear to have been named after their paternal grandfather and great-grandfather.

The article is written in Picard which is the native language of Romance Flanders (including Walloon Flanders in Belgium nowadays). It is unrelated to Flemish Dutch spoken further west that is one of the three national languages of Belgium, together with French and German and a non official language in French Westhoek. The various Dutch dialects spoken in Belgium and in France contain a number of lexical and grammatical features which distinguish them from standard Dutch. Crestien translates to Guislain (or Ghislain), and formal records were usually kept in Latin,  as the Flanders region was then governed as the Spanish Netherlands. de stil Couturier above can be translated as "fashion designer" and a member of the wool supply trade at that time as Guislains lands were sold. His titleage was sold at a later date. In those days, wool was gold.

Refugee from religious persecution
Louis du Bois fled persecution in France to Mannheim before 1650. He married Catherine Blanchan in Mannheim on October 10, 1655.

Family
Louis and Catherine had at least eleven children:
 Abraham Du Bois (1657–1731), who was also a New Paltz Patentee. He married Margaret Deyo, daughter of Christian Deyo, another New Paltz Patentee.
 Isaac Du Bois (1659–1690), who was also a New Paltz Patentee. He married Maria Hasbrouck, daughter of Jean Hasbrouck II, another New Paltz Patentee, and his wife Anne Deyo, daughter of Christian Deyo.
 Jacob Du Bois (1661–1745), married Gerritje Nieuwkirk
 Sarah Du Bois (1664–1726), married Joost Jansen Van Meteren
 David Du Bois (1667–1715), married Cornelia Vernooy
 Solomon Du Bois (1669–1759), married Tryntje Gerritsen Foochen
 Rebecca Du Bois (1671-by 1713)
 Rachel Du Bois (1675-by 1713)
 Louis Du Bois Jr. (1677–1749), married Rachel Hasbrouck. She was the daughter of Abraham Hasbrouck, another New Paltz Patentee and his wife, Maria Deyo, daughter of Christian Deyo.
 Mattheus Du Bois (1679–1748), married Sara Van Keuren.
 Magdalena Du Bois (1680-by 1713)

New Netherland immigration
Du Bois and his family moved to Wiltwyck, within New Netherland, around 1660, then to Hurley, New York. In 1663 the Esopus Indians captured Du Bois' wife Catherine and three children,  who were rescued three months later. According to legend, but unmentioned in the detailed journal of the rescue expedition's commander, Catherine Du Bois was singing the  about the Babylonian captivity when they were rescued. Louis Du Bois was also physically attacked by the Indians, but fought back and survived.

New Paltz patentee
Du Bois and others bought a 40,000-acre tract of land from the Esopus Indians in 1677.  The tract, known in 17th-century colonial New York as a "patent," stretched from the Hudson River to the Shawangunk Mountains.  Du Bois was one of eleven men to begin settling on a rise over the Wallkill River, in the center of the patent, in 1678. He served as one of the original elders in New Paltz's French Reformed Church, which is still in existence today.

In the early years, Du Bois and his fellow patentees governed the land communally.  In 1728, the surviving patentees and their descendants created a more formal form a government called "The Twelve Men" (later known as the Duzine). This body consisted of one elected representative for each patentee families.  Membership was restricted to their descendants through either male or female lines. To this date, some of the Du Bois land is still owned by family descendants.  In 1785, the New York State Legislature confirmed the actions of this body.  Although a standard form of town government was established in the late 18th century, the Duzine existed in at least ceremonial form into the 19th century.  In the later years of the Duzine, the members were consumed with lawsuits defending the boundaries of the New Paltz patent.  At one time, the Duzine hired Aaron Burr to represent them in such a lawsuit.

Final days
Du Bois himself eventually returned to Wiltwyck, by then known as Kingston, where he died prior to his will being granted probate on June 23, 1696. His widow remarried, and in her will freed two of her slaves.

Legacy

The original settlement of Louis Du Bois and his fellow patentees survives today as Historic Huguenot Street, a National Historic Landmark District.  The site includes the DuBois Fort, a colonial stone house built by one of Louis' sons.

W. E. B. Du Bois is said to be grandson of a loyalist descendant of Louis Du Bois' brother who left for the West Indies. Most of his descendants supported the revolution, though, and now, descendants of the family's "French father" can be found in every state of the union and in Canada.

Some of the notable descendants of Louis Du Bois include:
 George S. Patton, United States Army general
 Mary Cassatt, American painter and printmaker
 Marlon Brando, American screen and stage actor
 Joan Crawford, American actress 
 Sam Walton, founder of Walmart and Sam's Club
 Morton Deyo, United States Naval officer
 George H. Sharpe, United States Army general and New York State Assemblyman and Speaker
 Henry Granville Sharpe, United States Army general
 Abraham J. Hasbrouck, United States Congressman from New York
 Louis Hasbrouck, New York state assemblyman and senator
 Josiah Hasbrouck, United States Congressman from New York
 Sol Hasbrouck, Mayor of Boise, Idaho
 John Needham, former VP, Canon Canada
 Jon Huntsman Jr., Governor of Utah, United States diplomat and businessman
 Horton D. Haight, Mormon pioneer
 David B. Haight, LDS Church Apostle and Mayor of Palo Alto, California
 Jacob LeFever, United States Congressman from New York
 Frank J. LeFevre, United States Congressman from New York
 Jay Le Fevre, United States Congressman from New York
 Abraham A. Deyo, New York state senator
 Vernon Dubois Penner Jr., United States diplomat
 Brodie Van Wagenen, current sports agent and former New York Mets general manager
 Jeff Van Wagenen, pro golfer and businessman
 Gertrude Van Wagenen, biologist
 William Gilmer, United States Navy captain and naval governor of Guam
 Winfield Scott Schley, United States Navy admiral
 John Monroe Van Vleck, American mathematician and astronomer
 Edward Burr Van Vleck, American mathematician
 John Hasbrouck Van Vleck, American physicist, mathematician and 1977 Nobel Prize in Physics winner
 Theodoric R. Westbrook, United States Congressman from New York
 Roeliff Brinkerhoff, American lawyer and editor
 William Lounsbery, United States Congressman from New York and second mayor of Kingston, New York
 Walter F. Frear, Hawaii Supreme Court justice (1893–1907) and 3rd territorial governor of Hawaii (1907–1913)
 Trudy Stevenson, Zimbabwean politician and ambassador
 Charles G. DeWitt, United States Congressman from New York and chargé d'affaires in Guatemala
 Henry Richard DeWitt, New York state representative and clerk of Ulster County Board of Supervisors
 Lucas Elmendorf, New York state representative and United States Congressman from New York
 Washington Irving Chambers, United States Naval Officer
 Cornelius A.J. Hardenbergh, New York state representative and Shawangunk, New York supervisor
 Billy Bush, radio and television host, as well as nephew of President George H. W. Bush and first cousin of President George W. Bush
 Jonathan S. Bush, technology entrepreneur and brother of Billy (above)
 Darren O'Day, Major League Baseball pitcher for the New York Yankees
 Van Vechten Veeder, New York State District Judge appointed by President William H. Taft
 William Donovan III, college basketball player and high school basketball coach
 Bill Dole, college football coach at East Carolina University and Davidson College
 Cleve Benedict, US Congressman from West Virginia
 Alexander B. Donner, musician
 Katherine Lawrence Sharpe, wife of Ira Davenport, United States Congressman from New York
 Elizabeth Van Wyck Westbrook, wife of Marius Schoonmaker, United States Congressman from New York
 Mary Louise Schoonmaker, wife of Alton B. Parker, American judge and Democratic candidate for United States President in 1904
 Mary Elizabeth Hasbrouck, wife of Harcourt J. Pratt, United States Congressman from New York
 Shirley Deyo, wife of Douglas Dayton, co-founder of the Target Corporation
 Christine Hasbrouck D'Auria, wife of Billy Donovan, college basketball and National Basketball Association head coach
 Cordelia Phythian, wife of Vice Admiral Joel Robert Poinset Pringle, United States Navy
 Anne Justine Van Dyck, wife of college football coach John McLaughry

References

External links
Historic Huguenot Street
DuBois Family Association
Slavery's hidden history in the mid-Hudson Valley coming to light
Les origines d'ANNEQUIN

1626 births
1696 deaths
People of the Province of New York
People from New Paltz, New York
People of New Netherland